Vidigueira ( or ) is a town and a municipality in the District of Beja in Portugal. The population in 2011 was 5,932, in an area of 316.61 km2.

The present Mayor is Manuel Rosa Narra, elected by the Unitary Democratic Coalition. The municipal holiday is Ascension Day. The archaeological site of the Roman Ruins of Villa Áulica and Convent of São Cucufate are situated near Vidigueira.

Parishes
Administratively, the municipality is divided into 4 civil parishes (freguesias):
 Pedrógão
 Selmes
 Vidigueira
 Vila de Frades

Notable people

 Vasco da Gama (c.1460s – 1524) the Portuguese navigator, was made Count of Vidigueira by King Manuel I on the return from his discovery of the maritime route from Europe to India
 Achilles Statius (1524 in Vidigueira – 1581) humanist poet and commentator 
 The father of Baruch Spinoza (1662-1677) the Dutch philosopher, lived in Vidigueira in the 17th century, before escaping from the Portuguese Inquisition to the Dutch Republic.

See also
Vidigueira DOC

References

External links
 Town Hall official website

Towns in Portugal
Populated places in Beja District
Municipalities of Beja District